Daniel Ray McCullers-Sanders (born August 11, 1992) is an American football nose tackle who is a free agent. He was drafted by the Pittsburgh Steelers in the sixth round of the 2014 NFL Draft. He played college football at Tennessee.

Early years
McCullers was born in Raleigh, North Carolina on August 11, 1992, the son of Marcus Sanders and Phyllis McCullers.  He has an older sister, Deonica, and a younger sister, Dakita.  His parents were Phyllis McCullers and Marcus Sanders, him and his sisters spent much their childhood with their grandparents.

McCullers played high school football at Southeast Raleigh Magnet High School under Coach Daniel Finn and defensive coordinator Marvin Burke.  He recorded 55 tackles and four sacks during his junior year in 2008, and was an all-conference selection. He followed this up with 29 tackles and five sacks during his senior year in 2009, in which he helped Southeast Raleigh to a 10-3 record.  He was selected to the all-state second-team following his senior season.

College career
Lacking the grades to enroll at a Division I school, McCullers played his freshman and sophomore seasons at Georgia Military College.  During his freshman year in 2010, he picked up 27 tackles, including four tackles-for-loss, and one forced fumble.  In 2011, during his sophomore year, he recorded 37 tackles, including nine tackles-for-loss and two sacks, as part of a defense that held opponents to just 261 yards per game.  He was ranked a 4-star recruit by Rivals, and the number one junior college prospect at defensive tackle.

McCullers committed to Tennessee in January 2012, in part because the team was transitioning to a 3-4 defense, with which McCullers was more familiar with.  He finished the 2012 season with 39 tackles (20 solo), including a sack and 5.5 tackles-for-loss, to go along with a forced fumble and a pass broken-up.  He recorded eight tackles and blocked a PAT in Tennessee's loss against Georgia, and registered eight tackles in the Vols' loss to South Carolina.

After Tennessee head coach Derek Dooley was fired late in the 2012 season, there was speculation that McCullers would forgo his final year of eligibility and enter the NFL Draft. He decided to return for his senior year, however, even though the Vols' new head coach, Butch Jones, was planning to install a 4-3 defense.  Recognizing the importance of McCullers making a successful transition to the new scheme, Jones stated prior to the 2013 season, "We'll be as good as Dan McCullers goes."  He was named to the Athlon Sports Preseason Third-team All-SEC, and Phil Steele's Preseason Fourth Team All-American and Preseason First-team All-SEC. He finished the season with 33 tackles (21 solo), including 4.5 tackles-for-loss.  He recorded six tackles in Tennessee's upset of South Carolina, including a sack that knocked quarterback Connor Shaw out of the game.  He also blocked the second PAT of his career in the Vols' loss to Auburn.  He appeared in the 2014 Senior Bowl.

While at Tennessee, McCullers received frequent attention for his enormous size. He was the subject of a USA Today feature in September 2012, and a photograph of McCullers towering over a Tennessee trainer was widely circulated on the web.  He acquired numerous nicknames, such as "Mount McCullers", "Shade Tree" McCullers, "Big Dan," "Green Mile,"—after Michael Clarke Duncan's role in the 1999 film The Green Mile— and "Man Mountain."

Professional career
In February 2014, McCullers was one of five University of Tennessee players invited to participate in the 2014 NFL Combine.

At Tennessee's NFL Pro Day on April 2, 2014, McCullers registered a best of 5.32 seconds in the 40-yard dash, 7.75 seconds in the 3-cone drill, and 5.14 seconds in the 20-yard shuttle. He also managed 27 repetitions in the 225-pound bench press.  Mike Mayock, a draft analyst for the NFL Network, listed McCullers as one of the top five defensive tackle prospects in the draft. McCullers was drafted by the Pittsburgh Steelers in the 6th round of the 2014 NFL Draft.

Pittsburgh Steelers
McCullers signed a four-year contract with the Pittsburgh Steelers on May 19, 2014. McCullers wore #74 during the preseason, then changed to #92 for the regular season, but then swapped his number to #62 when James Harrison, who had previously worn #92 with Pittsburgh, re-signed with the Steelers.

He made his NFL debut in the Steelers' win over Houston on October 20, 2014. During his rookie year in 2014, McCullers played 9 games with 1 start making 3 tackles.

In his second season, he was limited to appearing in 12 games as a back-up to fellow defensive tackle Steve McLendon, and finished the season with 8 tackles and half a sack. He missed 4 games due to a torn labrum and underwent surgery to repair it in March 2016. After McLendon signed with the New York Jets in the 2016 offseason, McCullers switched his jersey from #62 to #93 and competed for the starting defensive tackle position with rookie Javon Hargrave. Hargrave won the job, again putting McCullers at the backup role.

On October 16, 2016, McCullers recorded his first career blocked field goal against the Miami Dolphins, deflecting Andrew Franks' 24-yard attempt. On December 11, 2016, McCullers received his first start of the season in place of an injured Hargrave, who had received a concussion the previous game. He did not record a statistic during the 27-20 victory over the Buffalo Bills. On January 1, 2017, McCullers registered his first full career sack in the Steelers' regular season finale against the Cleveland Browns, tackling quarterback Robert Griffin III for a loss of 8 yards on a 3rd and 5 in the fourth quarter. The sack proved costly for the Browns, as Cody Parkey missed a 49-yard field goal on the following play in a game the Steelers would eventually win 27–24 in overtime.

On March 22, 2018, McCullers signed a one-year contract with the Steelers.

On March 15, 2019, McCullers signed a two-year, $2.75 million contract extension with the Steelers.

On September 5, 2020, McCullers was released by the Steelers and was signed to the practice squad the next day.

Chicago Bears
On September 24, 2020, McCullers was signed off the Steelers practice squad by the Chicago Bears to replace John Jenkins, who was placed on the injured reserve list due to a ligament tear in his thumb. When Jenkins returned from injured reserve on October 16, McCullers was released and re-signed to the practice squad. McCullers was elevated to the active roster on November 7 for the team's week 9 game against the Tennessee Titans, and reverted to the practice squad after the game. He was promoted to the active roster on November 16.

References

External links
Pittsburgh Steelers bio
Tennessee Volunteers bio

1992 births
Living people
Players of American football from Raleigh, North Carolina
American football defensive tackles
Tennessee Volunteers football players
Pittsburgh Steelers players
Chicago Bears players